Bukit Nanas Monorail station is a Malaysian elevated monorail train station in Kuala Lumpur that serves as a part of the Kuala Lumpur Monorail (KL Monorail). It was opened alongside the rest of the train service on August 31, 2003. This station was formerly called P. Ramlee Monorail station.

Location

The station is located at the western tip of Ampang, constructed near and named after Bukit Nanas, where the Kuala Lumpur Tower, a water treatment plant and a forest reserve are situated. The station is located above Jalan Sultan Ismail, directly south from the Jalan Sultan Ismail-Jalan Ampang  intersection.

Due to its location, the station is typically busy during rush hours as well as public holidays, weekends and school holidays when patrons use the monorail to reach the Kuala Lumpur Tower. The station is also situated close to several commercial establishments down the roads.

Connecting station
The Bukit Nanas station is located 300m from the Kelana Jaya Line's Dang Wangi station via foot along Ampang Road; both stations are described by local rapid transit maps as connecting stations between both train services.
The connecting stations are not the interchange station or out of station interchange station. Commuter will be charged 2 single way journey fare instead of integrated fare whenever using these connecting stations.
However, you will have to exit the station, walk about 2 minutes to the other station's entrance, and buy a new ticket to change lines at this interchange. Because of this, covered walkways were erected along the road, as shelter and as a guide to either stations.

References

Kuala Lumpur Monorail stations
Railway stations opened in 2003